Rao Iftikhar Anjum  (born 1 December 1980) is a former Pakistani cricketer right arm medium fast bowler and right hand batsman. Rao Iftikhar Anjum is another addition to Pakistan's seemingly endless production line of pace bowlers. Iftikhar, however, is more Aaqib Javed than Wasim Akram or Waqar Younis, and his outswinger is considered by many to be as effective as Aaqib's. He can bowl reverse-swing - a prerequisite for Pakistani bowlers, when the ball gets a bit rougher, with good control over his yorkers. Iftikhar has performed consistently well in the domestic circuit since making his debut three years ago,

He took more than 200 wickets in Pakistani cricketing competition, before being added to the Pakistani national team, having taken ten wickets in the Patron's Trophy Final in 2004. He was rated the best bowler of the year in domestic circuit by former Pakistan's fast bowler Waleed Malik.

Iftikhar was included in the Pakistani team for the one-day series against India and made his Paktel Cup debut seven months later. He was included in the Pakistani squad to the 2007 Cricket World Cup. He played three games, and took five wickets. Despite a decent haul, his inability to bowl at the death stood out. With the re-emergence of Shoaib Akhtar and Mohammed Asif, chances for Iftikhar Anjum seemed to be few and far between from then on barring injury to any of the other major players.

However, with Shoaib and Asif falling foul of doping controversies, injuries, and disciplinary problems, Iftikhar was again called on and found himself as one of the more senior bowlers as Pakistan won the Kitply Cup in Bangladesh but failed to reach the final of the 2008 Asia Cup which they hosted.

He was signed by Surrey as their overseas player for the first part of the 2010 English season, while Piyush Chawla was playing in the IPL.

External links 
 

1980 births
Living people
Pakistan One Day International cricketers
Cricketers at the 2007 Cricket World Cup
Pakistan Test cricketers
Pakistan Twenty20 International cricketers
Islamabad cricketers
Surrey cricketers
Pakistani cricketers
Rawalpindi cricketers
Zarai Taraqiati Bank Limited cricketers
Federal Areas cricketers
Islamabad Leopards cricketers
Rawalpindi Rams cricketers
Punjab (Pakistan) cricketers
Cricketers from Khanewal
Pakistani Sunni Muslims